White Airways serve the following destinations, operating for TAP Portugal or/and CEIBA International:

Africa
Morocco
Marrakesh - Marrakesh Menara Airport
Casablanca - Mohammed V International Airport
Equatorial Guinea
Malabo - Malabo Airport
Bata - Bata Airport
Republic of Senegal
Dakar - Dakar International Airport
Cameroon
Douala - Douala International Airport
Benin
Cotonou - Cotonou Cadjehoun Airport
Republic of the Congo
Brazzaville - Brazzaville International Airport
Pointe Noire - Pointe Noire Airport
Ivory Coast
Abidjan - Abidjan International Airport

Europe
Portugal
Lisbon - Lisbon Portela Airport - Hub
Oporto - Porto Airport - Secondary Hub
Faro - Faro Algarve Airport
Spain
Madrid - Adolfo Suárez Madrid-Barajas Airport
Seville - Seville Airport
Málaga - Malaga Airport
Valencia - Valencia Airport
Bilbao - Bilbao Airport
Alicante - Alicante-Elche Airport

External links 
White

References 

White Airways